James Northrup Atkinson (October 6, 1877 – March 19, 1939) was an American football coach and politician.  He was the first recorded head football coach at Ottawa University in Ottawa, Kansas and he held that position for two seasons, from 1901 until 1902.  His career coaching record at Ottawa was 12–5–2.  Ottawa University football dates back to 1891, but the teams either played without a coach or no coaching records were kept.

Atkinson attended Ottawa University, receiving his A.B. in 1898, B.Sc. in 1900, and A.M. in 1903. He was president of the Ottawa University Alumni Association in 1902.
He also did post-graduate studies at Johns Hopkins University, University of Chicago and Columbia University, studying law at the latter. He was admitted to the bar in Kansas after graduating from the Kansas City School of Law in 1902. He was a member of the Phi Gamma Delta fraternity. He later practiced real estate law in Kansas City.

In 1913, Atkinson was elected as a Republican to the Kansas House of Representatives to represent the 9th electoral district, encompassing Kansas City. After serving a single term, he moved to Topeka where he worked for the state government. In 1920, he was appointed the State Accountant of Kansas, which he served until 1921. In 1923, he was named an accountant for the Kansas  Court of Industrial Relations. He served another stint as state accountant, and later the Kansas Public Service Commission, initially being appointed in 1925, serving until his resignation in 1927. He later worked as an auditor. He died in 1939.

References

External links
 

1877 births
1939 deaths
Republican Party members of the Kansas House of Representatives
Ottawa Braves football coaches
Ottawa University alumni
People from Hays, Kansas